Yury Favorin (born December 17, 1986 in Moscow) is a Russian pianist.

Life and career
Yury Favorin studied in Moscow at the Gnesins High School of Music. He took part at the Academy of the Festival Verbier (Switzerland, 2011), and the International Holland Music Sessions (TIHMS) (The Netherlands, 2011).

Prizes
 The 1st Nikolay Rubinstein Competition for Young Pianists (Moscow), 1st prize (Moscow, 2001)
 Gyorgy Cziffra Foundation, 1st prize (Wien, Austria, 2003)
 Andrey Petrov All-Russia Prize for Young Composers (“Crystal Tuning Fork”)

CDs
 Queen Elisabeth Competition of Belgium. Piano 2010. 3 CDs + Encore:
 CD 1 — F. Liszt. Concerto n. 1 in E flat major
 CD 2 — J.-L. Fafchamps. Back to the Sound
 Encore — F. Schubert. Sonata in E flat major D 568

 Anthology of the Russian Piano Music. Vol. 1 (1917–1991)
 CD 1: Nikolay Myaskovsky. Sonata no. 3, op. 19 (1920) ("Kapellmeister", studio-recording 2010)

 Nikolay Medtner: Complete Piano Sonatas. In 4 CDs
 CD 4: Sonata e-moll "Night Wind", op. 25 no. 2 (Moscow State Conservatory, live 2009)

References
 Olivier Messiaen Competition
 Queen Elisabeth Music Competition
 Marc-André Hamelin. Two Etudes from the «Twelve Etudes in Minor Keys»
 Tichon Khrennikov. Concerto №2, 3rd mov. Gala Concert from International Yampolsky Violin Competition 2008 (violin & piano)
 Franz Schubert. Sonate in E D 568 Queen Elisabeth Music Competition (piano). Semi-Final (Recital May 10, 2010)
 Franz Liszt. Concerto no. 1 in Es Queen Elisabeth Music Competition (piano). Final (May 24, 2010)

External links

 Official website

Russian classical pianists
Male classical pianists
1986 births
Living people
Musicians from Moscow
21st-century classical pianists
21st-century Russian male musicians